To N.Y. is the first studio album from the a cappella group Rockapella. The album featured covers of Japanese pop songs sung in English.

Track listing

Personnel
Scott Leonard – high tenor
Sean Altman – tenor
Elliott Kerman – baritone
Barry Carl – bass

Special appearances
Jacwelyn Carl – "Won't Be Long"
Lisa Leonard – "No No Boy"

1992 debut albums
Rockapella albums